The Bobby Vinton Show was a Canadian musical variety television series produced for the CTV Television Network between 1975 and 1978, with a total of 52 episodes broadcast. Featuring Bobby Vinton, a best-selling popular music singer since the early 1960s, the series mixed comedy skits with musical interludes. Appearing on the series as a regular was comedian Billy Van. The series often satirized Vinton's Polish heritage, and its theme song was an "umpah band" rendition of his 1974 song "My Melody of Love" (Vinton also ended each episode by performing the song himself). The series was created by Chris Bearde and packaged by Chuck Barris. The shows always commenced with a large woman named Monique dancing the guest out to the stage.

The series was syndicated to local stations in the United States, although the program's entry in the user-edited Internet Movie Database suggests it may also have been broadcast by CBS during 1975 (CBS did broadcast his one-hour special, Bobby Vinton's Rock N' Rollers, during 1978).

The series also spawned a 1975 soundtrack album on ABC Records; see The Bobby Vinton Show (album).

Guests appearing on the show included:

 Adrienne Barbeau
 Anne Murray
 Arte Johnson
 Barbara Walters 
 Charlie Callas
 Clifton Davis
 Donna Summer
 Ethel Merman 
 Foster Brooks 
 Hank Garcia
 Henny Youngman
 Jessica Walter
 John Byner
 Lainie Kazan 
 Loretta Swit 
 Lynn Anderson 
 O. J. Simpson
 Petula Clark 
 Phyllis Diller 
 Tanya Tucker 
 Ted Knight 
 The Spinners

External links

The Bobby Vinton Show on TV.com

CTV Television Network original programming
1975 Canadian television series debuts
1978 Canadian television series endings
1970s Canadian variety television series
1970s Canadian music television series
Television series by Barris Industries
Television series by Sony Pictures Television
Television series created by Chris Bearde